Social Democratic Union may refer to:

Social Democratic Union (Croatia)
Social Democratic Union (Ireland), started by Tommy Broughan in 2014 after he left the Labour Party
Social Democratic Union (Latvia)
Social Democratic Union (Serbia)
Social Democratic Union (Romania)
Social Democratic Union (Ukraine)
Social Democratic Union of Macedonia
Social Democratic Union of Workers and Smallholders, a political party in Finland
Social Democratic Union 'Proletarian', a political party in Bulgaria
Social Democratic Unionists, a political party in Syria
Polish Social Democratic Union, defunct political party in Poland